Agroplon Głuszyna is a Polish football club based in Głuszyna, Poland. The club currently plays in III liga which is the fourth tier of Polish football. It was founded on 1 January 1948. Agroplon Głuszyna are currently 15 on the table of III liga.

They, along with most of the league, were forced to suspend their season during the month of March, 2020. This was due to COVID-19 and the recommendation of the Ministry for Sport

References 

Association football clubs established in 1948
1945 establishments in Poland
Football clubs in Lower Silesian Voivodeship